Baptist Memorial Hospital  may refer to:

 NEA Baptist Memorial Hospital, in Jonesboro, Arkansas
 Baptist Memorial Hospital-Golden Triangle, Columbus, Mississippi
 Baptist Memorial Hospital-Memphis, in Memphis, Tennessee (formerly Baptist East)
 Research Medical Center-Brookside Campus, a hospital in Kansas City, Missouri that was formerly known as Baptist Memorial Hospital

See also
 Baptist Hospital (disambiguation)
 Baptist Medical Center (disambiguation)